Cathrine Høegh Dekkerhus (born 17 September 1992) is a Norwegian football midfielder who plays in the Toppserien for Lillestrøm. She previously played for Stabæk Fotball, with whom she played in the Champions League, scoring a winner against 1.FFC Frankfurt in the 2012 season's round of 32. She previously played for Lillestrøm SK.

As a junior international she won a silver in the 2011 U-19 European Championship.

Dekkerhus was named in Norway's squad for UEFA Women's Euro 2013 by veteran coach Even Pellerud. She played in the final at Friends Arena, which Norway lost 1–0 to Germany.

References

External links

 
 
 
 Norwegian National Team profile 
 Stabæk Club Profile 

1992 births
Living people
Norwegian women's footballers
Norway women's international footballers
Stabæk Fotball Kvinner players
Toppserien players
LSK Kvinner FK players
Women's association football midfielders
Sportspeople from Kongsvinger